BGI Group, formerly Beijing Genomics Institute, is a Chinese genomics company with headquarters in Yantian District, Shenzhen. The company was originally formed in 1999 as a genetics research center to participate in the Human Genome Project. It also sequences the genomes of other animals, plants and microorganisms.

BGI has transformed from a small research institute, notable for decoding the DNA of pandas and rice plants, into a diversified company active in animal cloning, health testing, and contract research. BGI's earlier research was continued by the Beijing Institute of Genomics, Chinese Academy of Sciences. BGI Research, the group's nonprofit division, works with the Institute of Genomics and operates the China National GeneBank under a contract with the Chinese government. BGI Genomics, a subsidiary, was listed on the Shenzhen Stock Exchange in 2017.

In 2021, details came to light about multiple controversies involving the BGI Group. These controversies include alleged collaboration with the People's Liberation Army (PLA) and use of genetic data from prenatal tests. BGI denied that it shares prenatal genetics data with the PLA.

History
Wang Jian, Yu Jun, Yang Huanming and Liu Siqi created BGI, originally named Beijing Genomics Institute, in September 1999, in Beijing, China as a non-governmental independent research institute in order to participate in the Human Genome Project as China's representative. After the project was completed, funding dried up, after which BGI moved to Hangzhou in exchange for funding from the Hangzhou Municipal Government. In 2002, BGI sequenced the rice genome, which was a cover story in the journal Science. In 2003 BGI decoded the SARS virus genome and created a kit for detection of the virus. In 2003, the Chinese Academy of Sciences founded the Beijing Institute of Genomics in cooperation with BGI, with Yang Huanming as its first director. BGI Hangzhou and the Zhejiang University also founded a new research institute, the James D. Watson Institute of Genome Sciences, Zhejiang University.

In 2007, BGI broke away from the Chinese Academy of Sciences and relocated to Shenzhen. Yu Jun left BGI at this time purportedly selling his stake to the other 3 founders for a nominal sum. In 2008, BGI published the first human genome of an Asian individual.

In 2010, BGI bought 128 Illumina HiSeq 2000 gene-sequencing machines, which was backed by US$1.5 billion in "collaborative funds" over the next 10 years from the state lender China Development Bank. By the end of the year, they reportedly had a budget of $30 million. In 2010, BGI Americas was established with its main office in Cambridge, Massachusetts, USA, and BGI Europe was established in Copenhagen, Denmark. By 2018, BGI opened offices and laboratories in Seattle and San Jose in USA, and London in the UK, as well were founded BGI Asia Pacific with offices in Hong Kong, Kobe (Japan), Bangkok (Thailand), Laos, Singapore, Brisbane (Australia) and many others.

In 2011, BGI reported it employed 4,000 scientists and technicians, and had a $192 million in revenue. BGI did the genome sequencing for the deadly 2011 Germany E. coli O104:H4 outbreak in three days and released it under an open license. Since 2012, it has started to commercialize its services, having investments from China Life Insurance Company, CITIC Group's Goldstone Investment, Jack Ma's Yunfeng Capital, and SoftBank China Capital. That year they also launched their own scientific journal, GigaScience, partnering with BioMed Central to publish data-heavy life science papers. A new partnership was subsequently formed between the GigaScience Press department of BGI and Oxford University Press and since 2017 GigaScience has been co-published with the Oxford University Press.

In 2013, BGI bought Complete Genomics of Mountain View, California, a major supplier of DNA sequencing technology, for US$118 million, after gaining approval from the Committee on Foreign Investment in the United States.

In 2015, BGI signed a collaboration with the Zhongshan Hospital' Center for Clinical Precision Medicine in Shanghai, opened in May 2015 with a budget of ¥100 million. They are reportedly being involved as a sequencing institution in China's US$9.2-billion research project for medical care which will last for 15 years. In May 2017, was announced formation of West Coast Innovation Center, co-located in Seattle and San Jose, on the first location planned to work on precision medicine and feature collaborations with University of Washington, the Allen Institute for Brain Science, the Bill & Melinda Gates Foundation, and Washington State University, while on the second's already existing laboratory with 100 employees to develop the next-generation sequencing technologies. In May 2018, reached an agreement with Mount Sinai Hospital (Toronto), Canada, for first installation of BGISEQ platforms in North America.

BGI Genomics, a listed subsidiary of the group made an initial public offering in July 2017 at Shenzhen Stock Exchange. In 2018, the BGI was reportedly 85.3% owned by Wang Jian, and the group owns 42.4% of its main unit BGI Genomics. The reported market value for BGI Genomics in July 2018 was around $5 billion, as is of another subsidiary, MGI Tech, specialized in developing and manufacturing technology, was reported to schedule an IPO of a stake of about 20% for $1 billion for 2019 in Hong Kong. In 2020 MGI closed a $1 billion series B funding round that included investment from IDG Capital and Citic Private Equity Funds Management. In 2021 it was reported that MGI Tech was planning to list in Shanghai.

In 2019, it was reported that a BGI subsidiary, Forensic Genomics International, had created a WeChat-enabled database of genetic profiles of people across the country. In July 2020, it was reported that BGI returned a Paycheck Protection Program loan following media scrutiny.

In 2021, state-owned enterprises of State Development and Investment Corporation and China Merchants Group took ownership stakes in BGI Genomics.

U.S. sanctions 

In July 2020, the United States Department of Commerce's Bureau of Industry and Security placed two BGI subsidiaries on its Entity List for assisting in alleged human rights abuses due to its genetic analysis work in Xinjiang.

In March 2023, the United States Department of Commerce added BGI Research and BGI Tech Solutions (Hongkong) to the Entity List over allegations of surveillance and repression of ethnic minorities.

Projects

Human genetics

Human Genome Project 

An international project launched in 1990 and declared complete in 2003. They joined in 1999 and provided 1% of the workload.

International HapMap Project 

An international project launched in 2002 and declared complete in 2009. They provided 10% of the workload.

Yan Huang Project 
Started in 2007 and named after two Emperors (Yan Emperor and Huang (Yellow) Emperor, BGI planned in this project, to sequence at least 100 Chinese individuals to produce a high-resolution map of Chinese genetic polymorphisms. An anonymous Chinese billionaire donated $10 million RMB (about US$1.4 million) to the project and his genome was sequenced at the beginning of the project.

1000 Genomes Project 

An international project to establish a detailed catalogue of human genetic variation launched in 2008 and declared complete in 2015.

International Cancer Genome Project 

An international project launched in 2008.

1000 Rare Disease Project 
An international projected jointly initiated with Children's Hospital of Philadelphia in 2011. With it were discovered genes and mutations associated with rare diseases, which was reported in more than 20 scientific publications. They also "co-developed a clinical whole exome diagnostic test offered through CHOP pathology since 2012". They again collaborated in 2017 when CHOP's Children's Brain Tumor Tissue Consortium was joined by BGI's China National GeneBank.

Cognitive Genomics Project 
A project called the Cognitive Genomics project focused on the research of the genetic basis of intelligence was announced in August 2012. American physicist Stephen Hsu joined as a scientific adviser and was one of the project's leaders. It was done on 2,200 samples mostly from the United States, out of which 1,600 were of individuals who participated in the Study of Mathematically Precocious Youth and reportedly have IQs over 160, collected by American psychologist and geneticist Robert Plomin. Other than publishing a new improved version of the popular Genome Wide Association Study tool PLINK, the project was never completed and the lead researchers moved to the US to set up the company Genomic Prediction which provides advanced genetic testing for IVF.

Animals and plants

1000 Plant Genome Project 

Named the 1000 Plant Genomes Project (1KP), this was an international project launched in 2008 and declared complete in 2015. The final results were published in Nature in 2019. In 2010, BGI has announced it will contribute US$100 million to large-scale sequencing projects of plants and animals. In 2018 it was announced that the 1KP project was being succeeded by the 10KP project to sequence 10,000 plant species to a high (chromosome level) quality.

Three Extreme-Environment Animal Genomes Project 
In 2009 BGI-Shenzhen announced the launch of three genome projects that focus on animals living in extreme environments. The three selected genomes are those of two polar animals: the polar bear and emperor penguin, and one altiplano animal: the Tibetan antelope. The Tibetan antelope genome was published in 2013, the polar bear in 2014, and the Emperor and Adelie penguin genomes in 2014.

International Big Cats Genome Project 
In 2010, BGI, Beijing University, Heilongjiang Manchurian tiger forestry zoo, Kunming Institute of Zoology, San Diego Zoo Institute for Conservation Research in California, and others announced they would sequence the Amur tiger, South China tiger, Bengal tiger, Asiatic lion, African lion, clouded leopard, snow leopard, and other felines. It was announced at the time that BGI would also sequence the genomes and epigenomes of a liger and tigon. Since the two reciprocal hybrids have different phenotypes, despite being genetically identical, it was expected that the epigenome might reveal the basis of such differences. The project aim was to significantly advance conservation research and was auspiciously announced for the Chinese year of the Tiger. The liger and tigon projects were never carried out, but results were reported in 2013 for the genomes of the Amur tiger, the white Bengal tiger, African lion, white African lion and snow leopard.

Symbiont Genome Project 
A jointly funded project announced on 19 March 2010, BGI announced it would collaborate with Sidney K. Pierce of University of South Florida and Charles Delwiche of the University of Maryland at College Park to sequence the genomes of the sea slug, Elysia chlorotica, and its algal food Vaucheria litorea. The sea slug uses genes from the algae to synthesize chlorophyll, the first interspecies of gene transfer discovered. This work was eventually completed presenting the genome assembly with a total length of 557 Mb.

Earth BioGenome Project 
BGI is a participant in the Earth BioGenome Project which aims to sequence and catalog the genomes of all of Earth's currently described eukaryotic species over a period of ten years.

Microorganisms

Ten Thousand Microbial Genomes Project 
The project was started on 1 August 2009, with the mission to sequence 10,000 microbes within 3 years. It includes sequencing industrial, agricultural, medical microorganism and many others. It is done in collaboration with many institutes, universities and enterprises, including Biotechnology Research Institute of the Chinese Academy of Agricultural Sciences and the Tianjin Institute of Industrial Biotechnology of Chinese Academy of Sciences.

COVID-19 
In January 2020, BGI Genomics announced its real-time fluorescent RT-PCR kit that helps in identification of SARS-CoV-2 virus that causes COVID-19. This was subsequently verified and authorized for use in 14 countries and regions, including emergency use listing by the World Health Organization. BGI Genomics reported that by April 2021 the RT-PCR kits had been distributed to more than 180 countries and regions. BGI also developed biosafety level 2 high-throughput nucleic acid detection laboratories, named Huo-Yan laboratories. As of end June 2021 BGI Genomics reported in its semi-annual report filed with the Shenzhen Stock Exchange that more than 90 Huo-Yan Laboratories had been installed in more than 30 countries and regions internationally.

In the first half of 2020, BGI Group's United States subsidiary CGI offered to help the state of California set up COVID-19 testing labs at cost. The government of California rejected the offer due to geopolitical concerns, but Santa Clara County did buy COVID-19 test kits and equipment from BGI.

On August 25, 2020, Reuters reported that about 3,700 people in Sweden were told in error that they had the coronavirus due to a fault in a COVID-19 testing kit from BGI Genomics. Despite being the 5th test to be given WHO Emergency Use Listing, and getting top marks in sensitivity tests in a Dutch study independently validating commercially available tests. BGI Genomics defended the product, blaming differences in thresholds used between labs looking at very low levels of the virus.

Bioinformatics technology 

In 2010, the institute 500-node supercomputer processed 10 terabytes of raw sequencing data every 24 hours from 30 or so Genome Analyzers from Illumina. The annual budget for the computer center was US$9 million. In the same year, BGI's computational biologists developed the first successful algorithm, based on graph theory, for aligning billions of 25 to 75-base pair strings produced by next-generation sequencers, specifically Illumina's Genome Analyzer, during de novo sequencing.

SOAPdenovo is part of "Short Oligonucleotide Analysis Package" (SOAP), a suite of tools developed by BGI for de novo assembly of human-sized genomes, alignment, SNP detection, resequencing, indel finding, and structural variation analysis. Built for the Illumina sequencers' short reads, SOAPdenovo has been used to assemble multiple human genomes (identifying an eight kilobase insertion not detected by mapping to the human reference genome) and animals, like the giant panda.

Up until 2015, BGI had released BGISEQ-100, based on Thermo Fisher Scientific's Ion Torrent device, and BGISEQ-1000, based on similar technology by Complete Genomics, for both of which received an approval from the CFDA for a NIFTY (Non-invasive Fetal Trisomy Test) prenatal test. In October 2015, BGI launched BGISEQ-500, a larger desktop sequencing system. It reportedly received more than 500 orders for the system and run over 112,000 tests until late 2016. The China National GeneBank, opened by BGI and Chinese Government in September 2016, has 150 instruments of the system. The BGISEQ-500 was developed as a sequencing platform capable of competing with Illumina's platforms. In November 2016, BGI launched BGISEQ-50, a miniature version of desktop sequencer. In 2017, BGI began offering WGS for $600. In October 2017, MGI Tech, a subsidiary of BGI, launched two new sequencers MGISEQ-2000 and MGISEQ-200 (later renamed as DNBSEQ-G400 and DNBSEQ-G50), while a year later launched the 60 human genomes per day capacity DNBSEQ-T7.

In 2021, BGI developed Stereo-seq, its genome wide Spatial transcriptomics technology and released the first research findings from a consortium of scientific users of the technology in 2022. In 2022, BGI-Research and University of Chinese Academy of Sciences together with scientists globally, used sequencing technologies to undertake single cell sequencing to expand the understanding of early human embryonic development, to complete the first whole-body cell atlas of a non-human primate, to complete the world's first body-wide single cell transcriptome atlas of pigs, and to study the brains of ants to explain for the first time how the social division of labor within ant colonies is determined by functional specialization of their brains at cellular levels.

Legal disputes 
In 2019, competitor Illumina, Inc. filed multiple patent infringement lawsuits against BGI. In response, BGI has filed patent infringement lawsuits against Illumina alleging violations of federal antitrust and California unfair competition laws. In May 2022 a US court ordered Illumina to pay US$333.8 million to BGI Group after finding that Illumina's DNA-sequencing systems infringed two of BGI's patents. The ruling also stated Illumina infringed the patents wilfully, and that three patents it had accused BGI's Complete Genomics subsidiary of infringing were invalid. In July 2022 Illumina and BGI Group's MGI Tech Co. and Complete Genomics, settled US suits on DNA-sequencing technology, with Illumina agreeing to pay $325 million to settle all US litigation. As part of the settlement Illumina will receive a license to the BGI affiliates’ patents, and both companies agreed to not sue each other for patent or antitrust violations in the United States for three years.

Collaboration with the People's Liberation Army 

In January 2021, Reuters reported that BGI has worked with the People's Liberation Army (PLA) and affiliated institutions such as the National University of Defense Technology on efforts to enhance soldiers' strength and other projects. In July 2021, Reuters reported that BGI developed a prenatal test, with the assistance of the People's Liberation Army, which is also used for genetic data collection. In an interview with the South China Morning Post, a BGI representative denied the Reuters report. The South China Morning Post stated that BGI published papers with the People's Liberation Army General Hospital and the Army Medical University, explaining in the article that in China "many top-notch hospitals are affiliated with the military." BGI further stated "All NIPT data collected overseas are stored in BGI's laboratory in Hong Kong and are destroyed after five years, as stipulated by General Data Protection Regulation (GDPR)". BGI also stated "BGI has never been asked to provide, nor has it provided data from its NIFTY tests to Chinese authorities for national security or national defense security purposes."

In response to the Reuters report, a German privacy regulator launched a probe of a German company's use of BGI's prenatal genetic tests. In August 2021, the UK announced a registration requirement with the Medicines and Healthcare products Regulatory Agency for BGI's prenatal tests. Regulators in Australia, Estonia, Canada, and Poland also raised concerns as did the U.S. National Counterintelligence and Security Center.

In November 2021, Reuters reported that a University of Copenhagen professor, Guojie Zhang, who was also employed by BGI was developing drugs for the PLA to assist soldiers with managing altitude sickness. BGI stated that the study "was not carried out for military purposes." On December 1, 2021, the University of Copenhagen commented on the Reuters report.

In October 2022, the United States Department of Defense added BGI Genomics Co, a listed subsidiary, to a list of "Chinese military companies" operating in the U.S.

See also
Chinese National Human Genome Center
Wellcome Sanger Institute
Broad Institute

References

External links
 

Biotechnology companies established in 1999
Biotechnology companies of China
Chinese brands
Chinese companies established in 1999
Companies based in Shenzhen
DNA sequencing
Genetics or genomics research institutions
Genomics companies
Research institutes in China
Companies listed on the Shenzhen Stock Exchange
Defence companies of China